The men's 200 metre freestyle event at the 1996 Summer Olympics took place on 20 July at the Georgia Tech Aquatic Center in Atlanta, United States. There were 43 competitors from 36 nations, with each nation having up to two swimmers (a limit in place since 1984). The event was won by Danyon Loader of New Zealand, the nation's first medal in the men's 200 metre freestyle. Brazil also received its first medal in the event, with Gustavo Borges taking silver. Bronze went to Australia's Daniel Kowalski.

Background

This was the 10th appearance of the 200 metre freestyle event. It was first contested in 1900. It would be contested a second time, though at 220 yards, in 1904. After that, the event did not return until 1968; since then, it has been on the programme at every Summer Games.

Three of the 8 finalists from the 1992 Games returned: two-time silver medalist Anders Holmertz of Sweden, bronze medalist Antti Kasvio of Finland, and fifth-place finisher Vladimir Pyshnenko of the Unified Team (now competing for Russia). At the 1994 World Aquatics Championships, Kasvio (gold), Holmertz (silver), and Danyon Loader of New Zealand (bronze) had been on the podium. They were among about 10 swimmers considered to have a chance at the gold medal in a relatively open field.

Croatia, Kazakhstan, Kyrgyzstan, Moldova, Russia, Thailand, Ukraine, and Uzbekistan each made their debut in the event. Australia made its 10th appearance, the only nation to have competed in all prior editions of the event.

Competition format

The competition used a two-round (heats, final) format. The advancement rule followed the format introduced in 1952. A swimmer's place in the heat was not used to determine advancement; instead, the fastest times from across all heats in a round were used. There were 8 heats of up to 8 swimmers each. The top 8 swimmers advanced to the final. The 1984 event had also introduced a consolation or "B" final; the swimmers placing 9th through 16th in the heats competed in this "B" final for placing. Swim-offs were used as necessary to break ties.

This swimming event used freestyle swimming, which means that the method of the stroke is not regulated (unlike backstroke, breaststroke, and butterfly events). Nearly all swimmers use the front crawl or a variant of that stroke. Because an Olympic-size swimming pool is 50 metres long, this race consisted of four lengths of the pool.

Records

Prior to this competition, the existing world and Olympic records were as follows.

No new world or Olympic records were set during the competition.

Schedule

All times are Eastern Daylight Time (UTC-4)

Results

Heats
Rule: The eight fastest swimmers advance to final A, while the next eight to final B.

Swimoff

Palmer and Sievinen, who had tied for 8th place in the heats to require the swimoff, tied again in the swimoff. This would have resulted in a second swimoff between the pair, but Sievinen elected to withdraw from the race, allowing the former to advance to the final A by default. Because Sievinen scratched out from the competition, the vacant spot in Final B was distributed to the next best-ranked swimmer, not yet qualified, in the heats.

Finals

There were two finals, one for the top 8 swimmers and one for the next 8 (9th through 16th).

Final B

Final A

References

External links
 Official Report
 USA Swimming

Swimming at the 1996 Summer Olympics
200 metre freestyle at the Olympics
Men's events at the 1996 Summer Olympics